was a Japanese speed skater. She competed at the 2013 World Sprint Championships in Salt Lake City, where she placed thirteenth. She also placed thirteenth in the sprint combination at the 2014 World Sprint Championships in Nagano. She competed at the 2014 Winter Olympics in Sochi, in the 500 metres (14th) and in the 1000 metres (22nd).

On 20 January 2018, she was found dead in her home in Nagano. NHK reported that she seemed to have committed suicide.

References

External links
 
 

1987 births
2018 deaths
Japanese female speed skaters
Speed skaters at the 2014 Winter Olympics
Olympic speed skaters of Japan
Universiade medalists in speed skating
Universiade bronze medalists for Japan
Speed skaters at the 2007 Winter Universiade
2018 suicides
Suicides in Japan
People from Kushiro, Hokkaido
20th-century Japanese women
21st-century Japanese women